Disztl is a Hungarian surname. Notable people with the surname include:

 Dávid Disztl (born 1985), Hungarian forward striker footballer
 László Disztl (born  1962), Hungarian footballer
 Péter Disztl (born 1960), Hungarian footballer

Hungarian-language surnames